Jocelyn Rae and Jade Windley were the defending champions, but both chose not to participate.

Tara Moore and Francesca Stephenson won the title defeating Malou Ejdesgaard and Amanda Elliott in the final 3–6, 6–2, [10–3].

Seeds

Draw

Draw

References
 Main Draw

Aegon Pro-Series Loughborough - Doubles
2011 Women's Doubles